Fagivorina is a genus of moth in the family Geometridae.

Species
Fagivorina angularia (Thunberg, 1792)
Fagivorina arenaria (Hufnagel, 1767)
Fagivorina deumbrata Lempke, 1952
Fagivorina grisea Mautz, 1941
Fagivorina tenebraria Fielder
Fagivorina viduata (Denis & Schiffermuller, 1775)
Fagivorina viduaria Borkhausen, 1794

References
Natural History Museum Lepidoptera genus database

Boarmiini
Geometridae genera